Upper Orange WMA, or Upper Orange Water Management Area (coded: 13), Includes the following major rivers: the Modder River, Riet River, Caledon River and Orange River, and covers the following Dams:

 Armenia Dam Leeu River 
 Egmont Dam Witspruit 
 Gariep Dam Orange River 
 Groothoek Dam Kgabanyane River 
 Kalkfontein Dam Riet River 
 Katse Dam Malibamatso River 
 Knellpoort Dam Rietspruit 
 Krugersdrift Dam Modder River 
 Mohale Dam Senqunyane River 
 Rustfontein Dam Modder River 
 Tierpoort Dam Tierpoort River 
 Vanderkloof Dam Orange River 
 Welbedacht Dam Caledon River

Boundaries 
Tertiary drainage regions C51, C52, D11 to D18, D21 to D24, D31, D32, D34 and D35.

See also 
 Water Management Areas
 List of reservoirs and dams in South Africa
 List of rivers of South Africa

References 
 

Water Management Areas
Dams in South Africa